The 2002–03 Egyptian Super Cup was the second Egyptian Super Cup, an annual football match contested by the winners of the previous season's Egyptian Premier League and Egypt Cup competitions,Ismaily (Egyptian Premier League champions ) withdrew protesting to play in Cairo instead of playing on neutral stadium, so Al Mokawloon Al Arab 5° of League play the super Cup , Zamalek won the game 1–0 after extra time.

Match details

References

Egyptian Super Cup
Super Cup
Egyptian Super Cup
Egyptian Super Cup